Nederland 24 was the collective name for a number of specialty television channels from the Dutch public broadcasting system. It also broadcasts a sample channel of the same name featuring a mix of programming from the other thematic channels. A couple of these specialty channel are still available, but are now fully under the wings of the NPO.

Originally it consisted of seventeen channels which were available through cable and online (cf. ).

Overview
The Nederland 24 channels were an expansion of the Dutch public broadcasting system, in which public broadcasting associations provide general programming. Based on the number of active members, broadcasting associations receive airtime on three national public television stations (NPO 1, NPO 2 and NPO 3). The thematic channels offered these broadcasting associations more airtime to expand its core programming. These channels broadcast round-the-clock, all day, hence the "24" part of the name.

History
The first step towards Nederland 24 was made by the VPRO broadcasting association with the introduction of 3VOOR12TV in May 2003. The success of this theme channel led to the launch of 3VOOR12 Central, 3VOOR12 On Stage, Journaal 24, and Holland Doc channels in December 2004 and /Geschiedenis in February 2005. Initially Nederland 4 was being used with the start of the internet portal Nederland4.nl on 6 April 2005.

From November 2006 the Dutch public broadcasting system started with the expansion of the number of channels to a total of 17. By 2009 this number dropped to 12 channels. The Nederland-e, DNTV, 3VOOR12 Central, and 3VOOR12 On Stage channels were cancelled and /Geloven and Omega TV merged into Spirit 24. On 1 April 2009, the Nederland 4 branding changed to Nederland 24, with the names of the theme channels including the "24" as a prefix, except for 101 TV.

In January 2009 it was announced that the political channel Politiek 24 would change into a sport/politics channel. Opvoeden doe je zo! will change to Z@ppelin 24, a children's channel.

Current channels
 NPO 1 Extra, formerly NPO Best and Best 24.
 NPO 2 Extra, formerly NPO Cultura and Cultura 24.
 NPO Nieuws, formerly Journaal 24.
 NPO Politiek, formerly Politiek 24.
 NPO Sport, formerly Sport 24.
 NPO Zappelin Extra, formerly Z@ppelin / Z@pp 24 and NPO Zapp Xtra.

Defunct channels
 3VOOR12 Central: innovative music videos and talk about alternative pop music. Shut down in 2008. Programmed by the VPRO.
 3VOOR12 On Stage: alternative pop performances and coverage of festivals like Pinkpop and Lowlands. Programmed by the VPRO.
 Consumenten 24: began as Consumenten TV and was programmed by several of the broadcasters, offering an insight on consumer defense. Shut down on March 31, 2012.
 DNTV (Dier en Natuur TV): a channel with main emphasis on animals and nature. Shut down on December 31, 2008. Programmed by the AVRO.
 Family 24: began as Opvoeden doe je zo! in 2006. Channel dedicated to parenting. Shut down in 2011 and merged with Z@pp Extra. Programmed by the KRO.
 Geloven: a channel dedicated to Protestantism. Shut down on December 31, 2008. Programmed by the NCRV.
 Geschiedenis 24: began as /Geschiedenis, featuring documentaries, reports and films about historic Dutch events. Shut down on March 31, 2012. Programmed by the VPRO and the NPS/NTR.
 Nederland-e: an educational channel. Shut down on December 31, 2008. Programmed by Teleac-NOT and RVU.
 NPO 3 Extra, formerly NPO 101 and 101TV, started in 2006 as a youth channel programmed by the BNN. Renamed NPO 3 Extra in March 2018 and shut down on December 24, 2018.
 NPO Doc: began as Holland Doc 24, the channel offered documentary themes with the central theme changing weekly. Programmed by the VPRO. After its shutdown in 2016 it became a programming strand on NPO 2, 2DOC.
 NPO Humor TV: began as Humor TV 24, broadcast comedy programs. Shut down in 2016. Programmed by the VARA.
 Spirit 24: created from the merger of Omega TV (programmed by the EO) and /Geloven, broadcast archived programming from the confessional broadcasters. Shut down on March 31, 2012.
 Sterren 24, began as Sterren.nl

See also
 3VOOR12
 Digital television in the Netherlands
 Netherlands Public Broadcasting
 Television in the Netherlands

External links
 NPO portal 

Mass media in Hilversum
Netherlands Public Broadcasting
Television in the Netherlands